Wolf Totem is a 2004 Chinese semi-autobiographical novel about the experiences of a young student from Beijing who finds himself sent to the countryside of Inner Mongolia in 1967, at the height of China's Cultural Revolution. The author, Lü Jiamin, wrote the book under the pseudonym Jiang Rong; his true identity did not become publicly known until several years after the book's publication.

Themes
Wolf Totem is narrated by the main character, Chen Zhen, a Chinese man in his late twenties who, like the author, left his home in Beijing, China to work in Inner Mongolia during the Cultural Revolution. Through descriptions of folk traditions, rituals, and life on the steppe, Wolf Totem compares the culture of the ethnic Mongolian nomads and the Han Chinese farmers in the area. According to some interpretations, the book praises the "freedom, independence, respect, unyielding before hardship, teamwork and competition" of the former and criticizes the "Confucian-inspired culture" of the latter, which was "sheep-like". The book condemns the agricultural collectivisation imposed on the nomads by the settlers, and the ecological disasters it caused, and ends with a 60-page "call to action" disconnected from the main thread of the novel.

The author has said he was inspired to begin writing Wolf Totem by accident: he ignored the advice of the clan chief of the group of nomads with whom he was staying, and accidentally stumbled across a pack of wolves. Terrified, he watched as the wolves chased a herd of sheep off a cliff, then dragged their corpses into a cave. From then on, fascinated by the wolves, he began to study them and their relationship with the nomads more closely, and even attempted to domesticate one.

Marketing
Wolf Totem exhibited strong sales almost immediately after its release, selling 50,000 copies in two weeks; pirated editions began to appear five days after the book first appeared on shelves. By March 2006, it had sold over four million copies in China, and had been broadcast in audiobook format in twelve parts during prime time on China Radio International. Jiang released a children's edition of the book in July 2005, cut down to roughly one-third the length.

Despite the author's refusal to participate in marketing the book, deals for adaptations of the novel into other media and translations into other languages have set financial records. Penguin Books paid US$100,000 for the worldwide English rights, setting a record for the highest amount paid for the translation rights to a Chinese book; an unspecified Tokyo publisher paid US$300,000 for the rights to publish a manga adaptation, and Bertelsmann bought the German-language rights for €20,000. The author has said that he believes that "in the West they may understand [my book] more fully" than in China.

Other writers took advantage of the author's anonymity to write fake sequels to Wolf Totem, including two books titled Wolf Totem 2, as well as Great Wolf of the Plains, all with the imprint of the Changjiang Arts Publishing House. As a result, in April 2007, the author issued a statement that denounced all such "sequels" as fraudulent; he indicated that he was doing research for another book, but would not be publishing anything new in the short term.

Critical reaction
Despite Jiang's stated refusal to attend any awards ceremonies or participate in any publicity, Wolf Totem has received more than 10 literary prizes, as well as other recognitions, including:

Named as one of the "Ten Best Chinese-language Books of 2004" by international newsweekly Yazhou Zhoukan
Nominee for the 2nd "21st Century Ding Jun Semiannual Literary Prize" in 2005
Recipient of the first Man Asian Literary Prize, November 2007

Criticism
Wolf Totem has also been the subject of criticism. Charu Nivedita, in his review in The Asian Age, called the novel fascist. He wrote, "Won’t we all prefer a peaceful desert to a fascist grassland where one dominating race devours all other in a macabre ritual of bloodbath?" German sinologist Wolfgang Kubin described the book as "fascist" for its depiction and treatment of the farmers. Pankaj Mishra, reviewing the English translation for The New York Times, described Jiang's writing as "full of set-piece didacticism."

The Mongol writer Guo Xuebo, a scholar of Mongolian literature and history, has said that the wolf was never a traditional totem used by ethnic Mongolians; on the contrary, the wolf is the biggest menace to their survival. His post to this effect on Sina Weibo on 18 February 2015 was questioned by many others. On February 25, he wrote an open letter, condemning the novel and the film, saying they "humiliate the ancestry, distort the history and culture, and insult the Mongolian people." Independent from his views, the wolf is a revered animal, which is regarded as having a heavenly destiny in Mongolia. On 20 January 2016, the Inner Mongolia Academy of Social Sciences, the leading academic and research institution in Inner Mongolia, said that there is no wolf totem in the beliefs of ethnic Mongolians. The institution found remains of ancient Mongolian totem worship in varying degrees among some tribes in ethnic Mongolia, but concluded there is no unified ethnic totem for Mongolian people after a wide range of fieldwork from April until July 2015 in Inner Mongolia.

English translations
First edition:

Film adaptation

Wolf Totem is a 2015 Chinese-language film based on the novel. Directed by French director Jean-Jacques Annaud who co-wrote with Alain Godard and John Collee, the Chinese-French co-production features a Chinese student who is sent to Inner Mongolia to teach shepherds and instead learns about the wolf population, which is under threat by a government apparatchik.

The Beijing Forbidden City Film Corporation initially sought to hire a Chinese director, but filming humans with real wolves was considered too difficult. New Zealand director Peter Jackson was approached, but production did not take place. Annaud, whose 1997 film Seven Years in Tibet is banned in China, was hired despite the history. The film was produced by China Film Group and French-based Reperage. The French director, who had worked with animals on other films, acquired a dozen wolf pups in China and had them trained for several years by a Canadian animal trainer.

Animated film
In November 2015, Le Vision Pictures has entered into a two-picture deal with The Lion King director Rob Minkoff and producing partner Pietro Ventani to co-develop and produce the epic animated feature based on the novel.

See also
 Zhang Chengzhi, a senior of Jiang's at the Chinese Academy of Social Sciences who was also sent down to Ujimqin Banner during the Cultural Revolution and rose to fame through his writings about Inner Mongolia
 Tengger, the Mongolian sky-god discussed in the novel

References

2004 Chinese novels
Fiction set in 1967
Chinese novels adapted into films
Chinese autobiographical novels
Novels about the Cultural Revolution
Novels set in Inner Mongolia
Works published under a pseudonym
Novels about wolves